Eugene Victor Hermanski (May 11, 1920 – August 9, 2010) was a Major League Baseball outfielder. A native of Pittsfield, Massachusetts, he attended Seton Hall University.

Signed by the Philadelphia Athletics as an amateur free agent in 1939, Hermanski made his Major League Baseball debut with the Brooklyn Dodgers on August 14, 1943, and appeared in his final game on September 22, 1953.

The Salem (Massachusetts) Evening News, reported on August 8, 1943, that the then-22-year-old outfielder, recently released from the USCG Salem Air Station in order to enlist in the USN's V-5 Aviation Training Program, was expected to use a month-long break to play for the Brooklyn Dodgers. "Hermanski hit a homer and two triples in an exhibition game with the Red Sox and poled out a homer and a double in a contest with the Braves."

When Hermanski played for the Brooklyn Dodgers along with Jackie Robinson, he demonstrated he was a great teammate by suggesting that all of the players stand in solidarity by wearing No. 42 to confuse potential snipers who were said to be out to kill Robinson because he had broken the color barrier.

Hermanski died in Homosassa Springs, Florida, at the age of 90.

Career statistics
In a 739 game major league career spanning nine seasons, Hermanski posted a .272 batting average (533-for-1960) with 276 runs, 46 home runs and 259 RBI. Playing primarily left and right field, he recorded a .977 fielding percentage. In two World Series (1947 & '49), he hit .219 (7-for-32) with 5 runs and 3 RBI.

References

External links

Major League Baseball outfielders
Brooklyn Dodgers players
Chicago Cubs players
Pittsburgh Pirates players
Durham Bulls players
Federalsburg A's players
Kinston Eagles players
Oakland Oaks (baseball) players
Olean Oilers players
Pocomoke City Chicks players
Seton Hall Pirates baseball players
Baseball players from Massachusetts
1920 births
2010 deaths
United States Navy personnel of World War II
Sportspeople from Pittsfield, Massachusetts